Vivian Curran is an American lawyer currently Distinguished Professor at University of Pittsburgh and is President of American Society of Comparative Law.

Education
JD, Columbia Law School
PhD, Columbia University
MPhil, Columbia University
MA, Columbia University
BA, University of Pennsylvania

References

University of Pittsburgh faculty
American women lawyers
American lawyers
Columbia University alumni
University of Pennsylvania alumni
Living people
Columbia Law School alumni
Year of birth missing (living people)
American women academics
21st-century American women